Skylab VIII is the eighth studio album by the Brazilian musician Rogério Skylab, the eighth in his series of ten eponymous, numbered albums. It was self-released on July 29, 2008; to promote the album's release, Skylab made an exclusive performance at the Cine Lapa in Rio de Janeiro. Skylab VIIIs liner notes state that it was dedicated to Marcos Petrilo, a long-time friend of Skylab who executive-produced his first two releases; he is also mentioned in the lyrics of "Meu Diário". Skylab has once claimed that while he doesn't think of Skylab VIII as one of his best albums, its cover art was one of his favorites.

A music video was made for the track "Eu Tô Sempre Dopado", directed by Amílcar Oliveira.

The track "Bat Masterson" is a parody of the Portuguese-language version of the theme song of the eponymous TV series, as sung by Carlos Gonzaga. "Casas da Banha" was re-recorded from his 1992 debut, Fora da Grei.

The album can be downloaded for free on Skylab's official website.

Critical reception
Blog Just One More Night gave the album a favorable review, stating that "Skylab has considerably evolved since [the release of] Skylab", and that "he and his band reach their creative peak with Skylab VIII".

Track listing

Personnel
 Rogério Skylab – vocals, production
 Thiago Amorim – electric guitar
 Alexandre Guichard – classical guitar
 Rodrigo Saci – bass guitar
 Bruno Coelho – drums
 Gabriel Muzak – electric guitar (tracks 1 and 5)
 Vânius Marques – recording, mixing
 Ricardo Garcia – mastering
 Solange Venturi – photography
 Carlos Mancuso – cover art

References

2008 albums
Rogério Skylab albums
Self-released albums
Sequel albums
Obscenity controversies in music
Albums free for download by copyright owner